The Red Mountain Expressway Cut, also known as the Red Mountain Geological Cut, is a section of Red Mountain that was blasted and removed in the 1960s to allow the Red Mountain Expressway to enter downtown Birmingham, Alabama.  This highway links Birmingham with its southern suburbs of Homewood, Mountain Brook, and Vestavia Hills. It has spurred suburban growth towards the south of Birmingham. This section also provides the route for U.S. Route 31 (US 31) to the south (the Montgomery Highway) and US 280 to the southeast.

The resultant cut exposes geological strata spanning millions of years (150 million years of geological time within  of exposure), including the red ore seam that spurred Birmingham's development. A new species of Lower Silurian (middle Llandovery epoch) phacopsid trilobite, Acaste birminghamensis, was first collected from exposures on Red Mountain. Named for the city, the new species was published in May 1972.

The cut was designated a National Natural Landmark in 1987.

Proposed tunnel
One of the original ideas proposed for linking Birmingham to its southern neighbors was the Red Mountain Tunnel project. This was seriously considered by the city and state highway engineers.  Two alternate routes were proposed, one starting at 18th Street and the other from 22nd Street.  Eventually the tunnel idea was abandoned due to its high cost and extended amount of time it would have taken.  The Red Mountain Expressway Cut was built instead.

See also
Birmingham District

References

External links

Freeways in the United States
Geology of Alabama
Geography of Birmingham, Alabama
Historic American Engineering Record in Alabama
National Natural Landmarks in Alabama
Transportation in Birmingham, Alabama
U.S. Route 31